"Pleader" is a song by British indie rock band alt-J. It is the eighth and final track (and fifth and final single) from their third studio album, Relaxer, and was released as a shortened radio edit digital single on 15 September 2017 by Infectious Music and Atlantic Records. The song was written by Joe Newman, Gus Unger-Hamilton and Thom Sonny Green and produced by Charlie Andrew.

Composition and lyrics
In an interview with NPR, the band said: 

The novel is referenced throughout the song, including the lyric "How green, how green was my valley?".

Music video
The music video for "Pleader" was released on 15 November 2017, directed by Isaiah Seret. It was executive produced by Rupert Reynolds-MacLean and produced by Sonya Sier.

Remix
The song was remixed by Mr Jukes, a music project of British musician Jack Steadman of the band Bombay Bicycle Club. The remix features British group The Age of L.U.N.A. and was released as a single on 25 October 2017.

Track listing

Personnel
Credits adapted from Tidal

alt-J
Joe Newman – guitar, vocals
Gus Unger-Hamilton – keyboards, vocals
Thom Sonny Green – drums, percussion, programming

Additional musicians
Ely Cathedral Boy Choristers – choir
London Metropolitan Orchestra – strings
Mark Rainbow – background vocals

Technical
Charlie Andrew – production, mixing, engineering, programming
Brett Cox – engineering
Jay Pocknell - engineering
Stefano Civetta – assistant engineering
Paul Pritchard – assistant engineering
Graeme Baldwin – assistant engineering
Dick Beetham – mastering

Artwork and design
Osamu Sato

References

2017 singles
Alt-J songs
2017 songs
Infectious Music singles
Atlantic Records singles
Songs written by Thom Sonny Green